Lalín is a municipality in Galicia, Spain in the north of the province of Pontevedra. It's the capital of the region of the Deza.

The town has a population of 20,158 inhabitants (2014). The surface of the municipality is 326.8 km2, being the biggest municipality in the province of Pontevedra and the fourth of Galicia, with a population density of 63.85 inhabitants/km2.

Located in the North-East of the province of Pontevedra; being bordered by Silleda and Vila de Cruces to the North-West, Forcarei to the West, Agolada and Rodeiro to the North-East, Dozón to the South-East and O Irixo to the South, all of them being part of the region of Deza, except O Irixo.

References

External links
 Concello de Lalín

Municipalities in the Province of Pontevedra